Stenostola dubia is a species of beetle in the family Cerambycidae. It was described by Laicharting in 1784, originally under the genus Saperda. It has a wide distribution throughout Europe. It feeds on Juglans regia and Corylus avellana.

References

Saperdini
Beetles described in 1784